The Silver City Galleria was an enclosed, two-level, super-regional mall located off Route 24 and Route 140 in Taunton, Massachusetts, United States. It was demolished in 2021.

The mall's facilities included 120 retail stores, 8 anchors, 33 customer services, a ten-screen cinema, 6 sit-down restaurants, 6 specialty eateries, an arcade, a food court, a center court, and a children's play area. IPC International managed security, and UGL Limited's Unicco managed facilities services.

Anchor tenants included Sears, JCPenney, Macy's, Best Buy, Dick's Sporting Goods, Regal Cinemas, and Round One Entertainment.

History
Development on The Silver City Galleria began in 1989, following the opening of the Emerald Square Mall in North Attleboro. ADD, Inc. designed the mall, and The Pyramid Companies planned and developed it at around the same time that several other malls in the region (Independence Mall, Now Kingston Collection, and Berkshire Mall) were being built. Construction on the Silver City Galleria began in July of 1990, and was completed in February of 1992. The Silver City Galleria opened on March 1, 1992.  When The Silver City Galleria first opened, it was seemingly situated in the middle of nowhere; the surrounding area was a forest, with little to no other developments. However, its strategic location at the intersection of Routes 24 and 140 and its close distance to the I-495 allowed Silver City to draw traffic from towns and cities in all directions, including Boston, Worcester, and Providence. The modern mall quickly became a popular shopping destination in the state of Massachusetts, bringing fatal competition to many other malls such as the now-defunct Mill River Place.

In 2002, Silver City Galleria was purchased in a joint venture between General Growth Properties and the Teachers' Retirement System of the State of Illinois in a $634 million deal that involved three other malls.

2016 attack

On May 10, 2016, two people were stabbed at the mall shortly after another two were stabbed at a nearby residence. Two of the victims died along with the attacker, who was shot by an off-duty sheriff's deputy. The attacker had previously crashed a Honda Accord into the Macy's store at the mall. The incident occurred at about 7:00 p.m. EDT.

The attacker was identified as 28-year-old Arthur DaRosa. According to DaRosa's sister, he checked himself into a local hospital the night before the attack and was released the following morning. He was also reportedly mentally ill and had been struggling with depression for years.

The attack started when DaRosa crashed his car on Myricks Street, located near the mall. DaRosa then began to run around the area erratically, attempting to break into a number of homes. He eventually broke into a house and stabbed Patricia Slavin, 80, and her daughter Kathleen, 48, with a kitchen knife. Patricia died in the hospital while Kathleen was being treated for life-threatening injuries. DaRosa then stole a Honda vehicle from the Slavin household, crashed it into the Macy's, stabbed two more people at a Bertucci's restaurant, and assaulted three other people before being shot by an off-duty police officer. One of the stabbing victims, 56-year-old George Heath, was killed while trying to rescue the other stabbing victim—a pregnant 26-year-old waitress named Sheenah Savoy, who survived.

Recent years
After the stock market crash due to the Great Recession in September 2008, Silver City Galleria saw a sharp decline in its traffic and its finances. Many retailers closed their stores and were not replaced. In March 2010, the mall had an estimated 75 percent occupancy rate, which is very low by industry standards. Some of the notable national brands that left were Old Navy, Max Rave and Pacsun.

The exodus only amplified the financial troubles plaguing the mall. The mortgage on the mall, serviced by Midland Loan Services, went into default in November 2009. In September 2011, negotiations to sell the mall fell through.

In mid-November 2011, the Galleria was bought out by Midland Loan Services, ending the ownership by General Growth Properties. In early December 2011, Silver City Galleria's management was replaced with Cushman & Wakefield Commercial Real Estate Management.

In July 2013, the mall was bought out again by the MGHerring group in conjunction with the Tricom real estate group. In April 2014, the mall announced it was set to undergo renovations, reducing the likelihood of foreclosure. On January 8, 2015, JCPenney announced it would be closing its store in Silver City as part of a plan to close 39 under-performing stores nationwide. The store closed in April 2015.

In May 2015, the mall announced that a new tenant, Round One, would be placed in the spot formerly occupied by Steve & Barry's and Lechmere. The mall also announced that the Regal Cinemas would be upgraded with a restaurant and a bar as well as recliner chairs and a new entrance. Both improvements were complete by December 2015.

Macy's announced on January 4, 2017, that they would be closing their Silver City location as part of a plan to close 68 stores; the store closed in April 2017. On September 15, 2017, Best Buy announced it would also be closing in October as part of a plan to close 15 stores nationwide, leaving Sears and Dick's Sporting Goods as the only remaining anchor tenants. On August 22, 2018, Sears announced they would close their Silver City location in November as part of a plan to close 46 stores nationwide, leaving Dick's Sporting Goods as the last anchor tenant.

In May 2019, the mall was foreclosed on by the Branch Banking and Trust Company due to an unpaid mortgage loan. On May 17, 2019, the Silver City Galleria was sold for $7.5 million at an auction. On June 19, 2019, Thibeault Developments, the new owners, said the mall's former owners and management would manage the mall during their ownership. They also said they would announce redevelopment plans in the near future. On October 17, 2019, it was announced that Bristol Community College would be leaving Silver City in 2020.

On February 4, 2020, the mall abruptly gave notices of termination to six tenants; the only remaining tenants were on the mall's west side or rear. The mall's main entrance was also closed at this time, with signs directing shoppers to the entrance near Regal Cinemas. The mall closed permanently on February 29, 2020.

Regal Cinemas shut down in 2020 as part of a temporary closure of all Regal theaters due to the COVID-19 pandemic. On December 11, 2020, it was announced Round One Entertainment would be closing in January 2021. Dick's Sporting Goods closed in early January 2021. On January 21, 2021, it was announced that Silver City Galleria would be demolished in February, with one investor saying it was too expensive to keep open. Demolition work began the following month. The Silver City Galleria was officially demolished by May 9, 2021.

References

External links
Silver City Galleria archived website
Silver City Galleria on Labelscar the Retail History Blog
Silver City Galleria Archive website archiving the history of the mall
Silver City Galleria Nostalgia on Facebook

Buildings and structures in Taunton, Massachusetts
Defunct shopping malls in the United States
Shopping malls in Massachusetts
Shopping malls established in 1992
Shopping malls disestablished in 2020
S
Tourist attractions in Bristol County, Massachusetts
Tourist attractions in Massachusetts
1992 establishments in Massachusetts
2020 disestablishments in Massachusetts
Demolished buildings and structures in Massachusetts
Buildings and structures demolished in 2021
Demolished shopping malls in the United States